Antonín Mikala was a Czech foil and sabre fencer. He competed in three events at the 1920 Summer Olympics.

References

External links
 

Year of birth missing
Year of death missing
Czech male foil fencers
Czechoslovak male foil fencers
Olympic fencers of Czechoslovakia
Fencers at the 1920 Summer Olympics
Czech male sabre fencers
Czechoslovak male sabre fencers